The 2018 Horizon League baseball tournament was held from May 23 through 26.  All six of the league's teams met in the double-elimination tournament to be held at the home field of the regular season champion, which was Wright State. The winner of the tournament earned the conference's automatic bid to the 2018 NCAA Division I baseball tournament.

Seeding and format
The league's teams were seeded one through six based on winning percentage, using conference games only. The bottom four seeds participated in a play-in round, with winners advancing to a double-elimination tournament also including the top two seeds.

Bracket

Play-In Round

Double-Elimination Rounds

References

Tournament
Horizon League Baseball Tournament
Horizon League baseball tournament
Horizon League baseball tournament
College sports tournaments in Ohio
Fairborn, Ohio
Baseball competitions in Ohio